The Bible College NIT (National Invitational Tournament) is an annual men's college basketball tournament held each year in late-February or early-March. Formerly known as the Small Bible College NIT, the tournament is held to give Bible colleges of less than 1,000 on-campus students a competitive national championship.

It is often considered "the kick-off to March Madness", and a tune-up for teams that also compete in the USCAA, NCCAA, and NAIA post-season. The tournament offers a unique opportunity for those teams to win a national title outside of their respective divisions, and for players who don't see much action during the regular season to have break out performances. The "Madness" was at its peak in 2011 when Davis College defeated Washington Bible College in double-overtime in the semi-final, and followed up the next day with another double-overtime victory over Trinity Baptist College to win their first title. In the 2013 edition, Trinity Baptist freshman Simeon Howard scored a career-high 27 points; and fellow TBC guard Calvin Leach, a walk-on, tallied 17 in the opening round against New England Baptist College. In 2015, Davis freshman Mark Riches earned tournament MVP honors after averaging over 18 points per game. Generally, six to ten schools compete in the tournament each year. The winner is recognized as the Bible College National Champion. The site of the tournament is rotated between several schools, with Word of Life Bible Institute being the most recent host.

Champions

See also 
 Association of Christian College Athletics
 National Christian College Athletic Association
United States Collegiate Athletic Association

References

Annual sporting events in the United States
College men's basketball competitions in the United States
Postseason college basketball competitions in the United States
2005 establishments in the United States
Recurring sporting events established in 2005